Infernal Devices may refer to:
 Infernal Devices (Jeter novel), a 1987 novel by K. W. Jeter
 Infernal Devices (Reeve novel), a novel by Philip Reeve
 The Infernal Devices, a series of novels by Cassandra Clare

See also
 Infernal machine (disambiguation)